Olhopil may refer to:

Olhopil, Vinnytsia Oblast, a village in Vinnytsia Oblast, Ukraine
Olhopil, Mykolaiv Oblast,  a village in Mykolaiv Oblast, Ukraine